Joseph Bergel or Bergl (2 September 1802, Prossnitz – 1885, Kaposvár) was Hungarian Jewish physician and author. His most important work is Die Medizin der Talmudisten (Leipzig and Berlin, 1885), with an appendix on anthropology as it is found in ancient Hebrew writings. 

He was well versed in rabbinical and modern Hebrew literature, and attempted to introduce a new meter into Hebrew poetry in a work he published under the title Pirḥe Leshon 'Eber (Hebrew songs), Gross-Kanizsa, 1873.

In German he wrote:
 Studien über die Naturwissenschaftlichen Kenntnisse der Talmudisten, Leipzig, 1880
 Die Eheverhältnisse der Alten Juden im Vergleich mit den Griechischen und Römischen, ib. 1881
 Der Himmel und Seine Wunder, eine Archäologische Studie nach Alten Jüdischen Mythografien, which was also published in Leipzig in the same year under the title Mythologie der Alten Hebräer, 1882

These works are not profound, but they bring together a certain amount of useful information. Bergel also wrote Geschichte der Juden in Ungarn, published in 1879 in Hungarian and German.

References 
 
 Chaim David Lippe, Bibliographisches Lexicon, v. 1, 2 
 Meyer Kayserling, Jüdische Litteratur, p. 131 
 Revue Etudes Juives, x. 266, 267 
 Ha-Ẓefirah, 1885, No. 12.

1802 births
1885 deaths
Writers from Prostějov
People from the Margraviate of Moravia
Jewish Czech writers
19th-century Hungarian male writers
19th-century Hungarian physicians
Jewish Hungarian writers
Hungarian writers in German
Hebrew-language writers
Czech medical writers
Moravian Jews